The Laval Rouge et Or women's basketball team represent Université Laval in the Réseau du sport étudiant du Québec of U Sports women's basketball.

History
At the 2019 U Sports Women's Basketball Championship, the Rouge et Or were the #1 seeded team. Heading into Nationals, the Rouge et Or sported a 17-1 won-loss record. The only loss took place versus the McGill Martlets in the final game of the season. The scoring leader during the 2018-19 season was Jane Gagne, averaging 15.4 points per game.

During August 2020, Claudia Émond was one of 18 former U Sports student-athletes announced among the inaugural participants of the U SPORTS Female Apprenticeship Coach Program. Funded through Sport Canada, the objective was to increase the number of females in coaching positions across Canadian universities, matching apprentice coaches who have recently graduated with a mentor coach.

International
Sarah-Jane	Marois : 2019 Summer Universiade

Awards and honors

U Sports Awards
Sarah Jane Marois: 2019 Nan Copp Award 
Khaléann Caron-Goudreau, 2019 Defensive Player of the Year

Peter Ennis Award
The Peter Ennis Award is awarded to the U Sports women's basketball Coach of the Year.

2018-19: Guilaume Giroux
2000-01: Linda Marquis
1999-00: Linda Marquis

U Sports National Tournament
 Nike Top Performers - March 8, 2020 - Bronze Medal Game: UPEI vs. Laval - Laval: Kim Letang

U Sports All-Canadians
2019 First Team All-Canadian: Sarah-Jane Marois

RSEQ All-Stars
First Team
2019 First Team All-Star: Sarah-Jane Marois
Second Team
2019 Second Team All-Star: Claudia Émond

Top 100
In March 2020, Rouge et Or basketball players Isabelle Grenier, Marie-Michelle Genois and Sarah-Jane Marois
Were named to the list of the Top 100 U Sports Women’s Basketball Players of the Century (2011-2020).

References 

Université Laval
U Sports women's basketball teams
Women in Quebec
Basketball teams in Quebec